This was a new event on the 2013 ITF Women's Circuit.

The wildcard pair Veronika Kudermetova and Evgeniya Rodina won the title, defeating Alexandra Artamonova and Martina Borecká in the final, 5–7, 6–0, [10–8].

Seeds

Draw

References 
 Draw

2013 ITF Women's Circuit
2013 Kazan Summer Cup - Women's Doubles
2013 in Russian tennis